The 2018 Philippine Basketball Association (PBA) Commissioner's Cup, also known as the 2018 Honda–PBA Commissioner's Cup for sponsorship reasons, was the second conference of the 2017–18 PBA season. The tournament allows teams to hire foreign players or imports with a height limit of 6'10". The conference started on April 22 and ended on August 8, 2018.

Format
The following format will be observed for the duration of the conference: 
 Single-round robin eliminations; 11 games per team; Teams are then seeded by basis on win–loss records.
Top eight teams will advance to the quarterfinals. In case of tie, a playoff game will be held only for the #8 seed.
Quarterfinals:
QF1: #1 vs #8 (#1 twice-to-beat)
QF2: #2 vs #7 (#2 twice-to-beat)
QF3: #3 vs #6 (best-of-3 series)
QF4: #4 vs #5 (best-of-3 series)
Semifinals (best-of-5 series):
SF1: QF1 Winner vs. QF4 Winner
SF2: QF2 Winner vs. QF3 Winner
Finals (best-of-7 series)
F1: SF1 Winner vs SF2 Winner

Elimination round

Team standings

Schedule

Results

Bracket

Quarterfinals

(1) Rain or Shine vs. (8) GlobalPort

(2) Alaska vs. (7) Magnolia

(3) TNT vs. (6) San Miguel

(4) Meralco vs. (5) Barangay Ginebra

Semifinals

(1) Rain or Shine vs. (5) Barangay Ginebra

Note: Game 2 of the Rain or Shine – Barangay Ginebra semifinals series was originally scheduled on July 17, 2018, but was postponed due to inclement weather brought by Tropical Storm Son-Tinh (Henry).

(2) Alaska vs. (6) San Miguel

Note: Game 3 of the Alaska – San Miguel semifinals series was originally scheduled on July 18, 2018, but was postponed due to inclement weather brought by Tropical Storm Son-Tinh (Henry).

Finals

Imports 
The following is the list of imports, which had played for their respective teams at least once, with the returning imports in italics. Highlighted are the imports who stayed with their respective teams for the whole conference.

Awards

Conference
The Best Player and Best Import of the Conference awards were handed out prior to Game 4 of the Finals, at the Smart Araneta Coliseum:
Best Player of the Conference: June Mar Fajardo 
Best Import of the Conference: Justin Brownlee 
Finals MVP: Scottie Thompson

Players of the Week

References

External links
 PBA Official Website

Commissioner's Cup
PBA Commissioner's Cup